John Herbert Pemberton (11 January 1883 – 29 May 1968) was an Australian rules footballer who played with Richmond in the Victorian Football League (VFL).

Pemberton made three senior appearances for Richmond in their inaugural VFL season, all of which they lost. He subsequently played for North Melbourne and Northcote in the Victorian Football Association. Pemberton returned to the VFL in 1931 as coach of North Melbourne and was in charge for eight games. North Melbourne lost each of them as well, meaning that Pemberton failed to experience a win either as a player or coach in the VFL.

References

External links

Jack Pemberton's playing statistics from The VFA Project

1883 births
Richmond Football Club players
North Melbourne Football Club (VFA) players
Northcote Football Club players
North Melbourne Football Club coaches
Australian rules footballers from Victoria (Australia)
1968 deaths